Climate restoration is the climate change goal and associated actions to restore  to levels humans have actually survived long-term, below 300 ppm. This would restore the Earth system generally to a safe state, for the well-being of future generations of humanity and nature. Actions also include restoring pre-industrial atmospheric methane levels by accelerating natural methane oxidation.

Climate restoration enhances legacy climate goals (stabilizing earth's climate) to include ensuring the survival of humanity by restoring  to levels of the last 6000 years that allowed agriculture and civilization to develop.

Restoration and mitigation
Climate restoration is the goal underlying climate change mitigation, whose actions are intended to "limit the magnitude or rate of long-term climate change".  Advocates of climate restoration accept that climate change has already had major negative impacts which threaten the long-term survival of humanity. The current mitigation pathway leaves the risk that conditions will go beyond adaptation and abrupt climate change will be upon us.  There is a human moral imperative to maximize the chances of future generations' survival.  By promoting the vision of the "survival and flourishing of humanity", with the Earth System restored to a state close to that in which our species and civilization evolved, advocates claim that there is a huge incentive for innovation and investment to ensure that this restoration takes place safely and in a timely fashion. As stated in "The Economist" in November 2017, "in any realistic scenario, emissions cannot be cut fast enough to keep the total stock of greenhouse gases sufficiently small to limit the rise in temperature successfully. But there is barely any public discussion of how to bring about the extra “negative emissions" needed to reduce the stock of  ... Unless that changes, the promise of limiting the harm of climate change is almost certain to be broken."

Climate restoration as a policy goal

A first peer-reviewed article about climate restoration was published in April 2018 by the Rand Corporation.

The analysis "examines climate restoration through the lens of risk management under conditions of deep uncertainty, exploring the technology, economic, and policy conditions under which it might be possible to achieve various climate restoration goals and the conditions under which society might be better off with (rather than without) a climate restoration goal." One key finding of the study is that it would be possible to restore the  atmospheric concentrations to preindustrial levels at an acceptable cost under two scenarios, where greenhouse gas reductions and direct air capture (DAC) technologies prove to be economically efficient. One example is Carbon Engineering, a Canadian-based clean energy company focussing on the commercialization of Direct Air Capture (DAC) technology that captures carbon dioxide directly from the atmosphere.

One key recommendation of the Rand Corporation study is that an ambitious climate restoration goal may seek to achieve preindustrial concentration by 2075, or by the end of the century. It concludes that "The best we can do is pursue climate restoration with a passion while embedding it in a process of testing, experimentation, correction, and discovery."

On September 25, 2018, Rep. Jamie Raskin introduced a resolution on Climate Restoration to the U.S House Committee of Energy and Commerce, concluding with "Whereas scientists have researched methods for keeping warming below 2° C, but have not yet researched the best methods to remove all excess , stop sea-level rise, and restore a safe and healthy climate for future generations; and whereas declaring a goal of restoring a safe and healthy climate will encourage scientists to research the most effective ways to restore safe  levels, stop sea-level rise, and restore a safe and healthy climate for future generations." This was followed by the Congressional Climate Emergency Resolutions (S.Con.Res.22, H.Con.Res.52) which "demands a national, social, industrial, and economic mobilization of the resources and labor of the United States at a massive-scale to halt, reverse, mitigate, and prepare for the consequences of the climate emergency and to restore the climate for future generations....”

Critical parameters
The endpoint goal of climate restoration is to generally maximize the probability of survival of our species and civilization by restoring Atmospheric CO2 levels. The approximate target levels are those of the Holocene norm in which our species and civilization most recently evolved. That is stated technically as "pre-industrial", or poetically as "like our grandparents had a hundred years ago". Numerically the goal is stated as getting atmospheric CO2 back below the highest levels humans have actually survived long-term, 300 ppm, by 2050. Achieving this will require permanently removing approximately a trillion tonnes of atmospheric .

Critical parameters of the Earth System include:

 levels of climate forcing agents in the atmosphere, especially  and methane for positive forcing and  aerosol for negative forcing;
 global mean surface temperature (compared to some baseline) and its rate of increase;
 sea level and the rate that sea level is rising;
 pH and rate of ocean acidification.
 Ice levels of the polar ice caps.

One of the principal goals for climate restoration is to bring the  level down from current level of ~420 ppm (2022) towards its pre-industrial level of ~280 ppm.  Not only will this reduce ’s global warming effect but also its effect on ocean acidification. The removed carbon would be sequestered or used as a construction material.

Climate restoration open letter
On November 13, 2020, an open letter, put together by the youth organisation Worldward, calling for climate restoration was published in the Guardian newspaper. The letter was signed by prominent scientists and activists, including: Dr Michael E Mann, Dr James Hansen, George Monbiot, Hindou Oumarou Ibrahim, Dr Rowan Williams, Bella Lack, Will Attenborough, Mark Lynas, Chloe Ardijis, Dr Shahrar Ali, and many more. After its publication, the letter was opened up to general signatories, and the signatories published on Worldward's website.

Climate Restoration publications

White Paper
On September 17, 2019, the Foundation for Climate Restoration published a White Paper on existing Climate Restoration solutions and developing technologies. These solutions and technologies include proven, commercially viable projects, such as creating synthetic rock from carbon captured in the air for use in construction and paving, as well as emerging methods for removing and storing carbon, restoring oceans and fisheries. The White Paper also discusses Climate Restoration strategy and costs. A main goal of the Foundation for Climate Restoration is the reduction of atmospheric  to below 300 ppm (i.e. near its pre-industrial level) by 2050.

Climate Restoration: The Only Future That Will Sustain the Human Race
Authored by Peter Fiekowsky and Carole Douglas, this book was published on April 21, 2022. It describes, among others, the criteria for Climate restoration: Permanence —so the  stays out of the atmosphere for at least 100 years; Scalability —the method must be able to remove at least 25 billion tons of  a year; Financial viability—funding for at-scale carbon removal must be in place. It then describes four solutions that appear to fit the criteria: a) ocean fertilization; b) synthetic limestone; c) seaweed; d) enhanced atmospheric methane oxidation using iron chloride. It claims that the required technologies and finance are now in place to restore the climate. Scale-up now requires that the restoration goal be endorsed by the UN and large NGOs so that investors and governments can justify funding the projects. Because the projects are commercially self-funding, initial investments of only $2 billion per year through 2030 are estimated to be required globally.

Limitations
Not every aspect of the Earth System can be returned to a previous state: notably the warming of the deep sea or deep ocean and the associated sea level rise which has already taken place may be essentially irreversible this century. Conversely, there are certain aspects of the Earth System that need to be improved with respect to the recent past: notably food productivity, considering an increased global population by 2050 or 2100.

Key organisations
Worldward  
Foundation for Climate Restoration
Global Coalition for Climate Restoration
The Climate Foundation

References

Climate engineering
Climate change policy
Ecological restoration
Environmental terminology
Planetary engineering